is an anti-nuclear organization and campaign in Japan. Translated, its full name means "10-Million People Action [to say] Goodbye to Nuclear Power Plants", and as the name would suggest, its aim is to gather 10 million signatures protesting against nuclear power plants. As of December 2013, the campaign had collected 8.3 million signatures.

Aims 

The group would like to see Japan's energy policy shifted away from nuclear power and towards renewable energy. The group's petition says, "What has become clear from the Fukushima nuclear disaster and later developments is this hard fact: there is no nuclear energy that is safe. In other words, nuclear technology and humanity cannot coexist."

Activities 

As well as collecting signatures, the organization has held several anti-nuclear rallies. It held a rally of 60,000 people in Meiji Park (near Meiji Shrine), Tokyo, on September 17, 2011, and a rally in Koriyama, Fukushima, on March 11, 2012, the first anniversary of the Fukushima nuclear disaster. On July 16, 2012, it held a rally in Yoyogi Park, Tokyo, which drew 170,000 people. It has been suggested that these anti-nuclear protests and related activities may indicate new levels of political activism from urban workers and young people.

Members 

The group counts well-known celebrities in its ranks. Among the founding members are writer Kenzaburō Ōe, historian Shunsuke Tsurumi, and authors Hisae Sawachi, Katsuto Uchihashi and Keiko Ochiai. According to the group, its supporters also include Minamisoma Mayor Katsunobu Sakurai and Tokai Village Mayor Tatsuya Murakami, as well as film director Yoji Yamada and actress Sayuri Yoshinaga.

See also
Anti-nuclear groups
Anti-nuclear power movement in Japan
Genpatsu-shinsai
Japanese reaction to Fukushima Daiichi nuclear disaster
Politics of nuclear power

References

External links 
 

Anti-nuclear organizations
Nuclear power in Japan
Environmental organizations based in Japan
Fukushima Daiichi nuclear disaster
Protests in Japan